YooHoo & Friends is an animated series, produced by Toonzone Studios and is loosely based on the Korean children's toyline of the same name by Aurora World. Created by David Feiss, the series both serves as a gag dub and retelling of the original 2009 South Korean animated series based on the YooHoo and Friends franchise, with changes being made so western audiences to relate to the series more. The series follows a group of corrupt corporate executives who are turned into the eponymous animal gang by Father Time who tasks them to go around the world and fix all of the environmental disasters that they caused. The series debuted on January 8, 2012, airing in Latin America on Cartoon Network, in the UK on Pop and in Australia on ABC.

Plot
YooHoo & Friends is about five executives who work for a fictional corporation called Nasty Corp. When Mother Nature notices that they've been slowly destroying the earth through water, air, and land pollution, she pressures Father Time to stop them from completely destroying the Earth by turning them into five baby animals. Together, Lemmee the sourpuss, Roodee the inventor, Pammee the princess, Chewoo the optimist, and YooHoo the leader save the world from all the environmental disasters they caused as their human-selves, in return for the gemstones Father Time planted in the locations they visit. When all of the gems are found, the Furry 5 can make a wish to become human again.

Each episode includes a narration from Father Time as he goes back to certain past time periods and adjusts them.

Characters

Main Characters
 Father Time (voiced by Flavor Flav) controls time and acts as the narrator of the series, introducing each episode. He gives the Furry 5 the task to fix all the environmental destruction they caused as executives and find gemstones along the way that will allow them to make a wish and become human again.
 Mother Nature (voiced by Mara Kay) is Father Time's wife. She was hurt and angered by Nasty Corporation's environmental destruction and ordered Father Time to stop them immediately. She loves her husband and always tries to keep him on track with the Furry 5 and their task to find the gemstones.
 YooHoo (voiced by Cedric Themole) is a bush baby and the leader of the Furry 5 who guides the others in search for gemstones. He has cream and grey fur, blue eyes and a blue and grey striped tail.
 Lemmee (voiced by Mark Mathison) is a ring-tailed lemur and the sourpuss. He constantly tries to convince the others that he should be the leader instead of YooHoo. He has grey and black fur, yellow eyes and a grey and white striped tail.
 Roodee (voiced by Jan Bos) is a capuchin monkey and the inventor. He has brown fur and yellow eyes.
 Pammee (voiced by Michelle Brezinski) is a fennec fox and the princess. She has a connection to nature and can understand when an animal is hurt or a tree is thirsty. She has white fur, pink eyes and a pink and white striped tail.
 Chewoo (voiced by Mara Kay) is a red squirrel and the cheerleader. She is always excited and happy, even in the most dangerous of situations. She has red and white fur and pink eyes.

Recurring Characters
 Pookee 1, 2 and 16 (voiced by Mark Mathison, Jesse Innocalla and Cedric Themole respectively) are a trio of meerkats who try to steal the Furry 5's gems to make their wish. They have brown fur, green eyes and purple, pink and yellow eye markings and tail tips.
 Santa Claus (voiced by David Feiss) is Father Time's next door neighbour and has a friend-enemy relationship with him.
 The Easter Bunny (voiced by Jesse Inocalla) is another friend to Father Time.
 Leper (voiced by Cedric Themole) is a leprechaun who's also friends with Father Time.
Happy (voiced by Jesse Inocalla) is a red panda and a frequent guest companion of YooHoo & Friends. He's married to a sea cow named Martha.
Loonee (voiced by Jesse Inocalla) is a delusional snowy owl who wants to be a pop star and constantly sings, despite being tone deaf.

Production
David Feiss stated in an interview that he was contacted by Konnie Kwak, the president of Toonzone Studios, to make the original YooHoo & Friends series into something he could sell to western television. He then approached it similarly to Woody Allen's What's Up, Tiger Lily?, where "a foreign language film is re-dubbed in English with an entirely different story, it could be funny." He rewrote dialogue and created 4 minutes of new animation per episode. Feiss has also said that he moved to a house across from Flavor Flav, the voice of Father Time and he agreed to be on the show.

Kwak once saw YooHoo & Friends stuffed toys and thought "they looked pretty cute. The toys had already inspired a 52-episode animated series for younger kids, which aired in South Korea and had received many prestigious awards in that country. But like many Korean properties, it doesn't translate well overseas. So [they planned] to repurpose the episodes to broaden the market." The team had prepared the adaptation for a six to 12-year-old demographic.

On October 14, 2010, Flav narrated a sneak peek of the series for MIPJunior that was uploaded by Toonzone to YouTube. By 2013, the video was privated.

Eventually, the opportunity to fully develop another season for the series was postponed, causing Toonzone Studios to take legal action against Aurora World over the contractual copyrights of the series, that caused Aurora World to end up breaking the deal with Toonzone and licensing its franchise to Lawless Entertainment in June 2014.

Episodes

Broadcast
YooHoo & Friends debuted on Cartoon Network's Movimiento/Movimento Cartoon block in America on January 8, 2012, and later on Boomerang. The second season of the original series also premiered on Boomerang on March 1, 2015, advertised as if it were the same series. The series also premiered on ABC Me in Australia on February 15, 2012, and on Pop in the United Kingdom in the same year.

The series' distributor, Moonscoop US, originally planned for the show to air on French and German-speaking territories across Europe, "with hopes to reach televisions in next summer," but this never happened.

Media information
A game for the series called "Fling the Furry 5" was released on the now defunct YooHooWorldWide website. Toonzone Studios also planned to release a new line of plush toys, playsets, and light up dolls for the series that never happened.

References

External links

 on ABC Me

2010s American animated television series
2010s American black comedy television series
2010s American workplace comedy television series
2012 American television series debuts
2012 American television series endings
American children's animated adventure television series
American children's animated comedy television series
American flash animated television series
American television series based on South Korean television series
English-language television shows
Environmental television
Television series created by David Feiss
Animated television series about animals
Anime-influenced Western animated television series